Tehree Alice Gordon is an Australian volunteer who has been working with animals since the 1950s. In 1975, Gordon and her husband established the Jirrahlinga Koala and Wildlife Sanctuary. Upon opening, Jirrahlinga became the first ever koala sanctuary to be established in Victoria, Australia. In 2001, Gordon was awarded the Centenary Medal and she was named the Senior Australian of the Year in 2004.

Career
In the late 1950s, Gordon began her career working with animals as a volunteer. In 1975, Gordon was influenced to create an animal sanctuary after becoming the owner of a kangaroo. That year, Gordon and her husband established the Jirrahlinga Koala and Wildlife Sanctuary which became the first koala sanctuary in Victoria, Australia. At Jirrahlinga, Gordon takes care of pets for elderly and sick owners while allowing children who have experienced abuse to spend time with the animals. Other places that Gordon became a co-owner of include the Chewton Dingo Farm in 2005 and Halls Gap Zoo in 2016.

Personal life
Gordon is married to her husband Hamish, who became a co-owner of Jirrahlinga since 1981. In 1998, Gordon was diagnosed with multiple sclerosis.

Awards and honours
In 2001, Gordon was awarded the Centenary Medal for her work in animal welfare. In 2004, Gordon was named the Senior Australian of the Year. In 2012, Gordon and her husband were awarded at the Pride of Australia Awards. In 2017, Gordon was given a lifetime achievement award from Volunteering Victoria.

References

Australian of the Year Award winners
Year of birth missing (living people)
Living people
Australian naturalists